This article shows all participating team squads at the 2013 FIVB Volleyball Men's Club World Championship, held from 15 to 20 October 2013 in Betim, Brazil.

Pool A

Trentino Diatec

Head Coach:  Roberto Serniotti

UPCN San Juan

Head Coach:  Fabián Armoa

Kalleh Mazandaran

Head Coach:  Behrouz Ataei

Panasonic Panthers

Head Coach:  Masashi Nambu

Pool B

Sada Cruzeiro

Head Coach:  Marcelo Méndez

Lokomotiv Novosibirsk

Head Coach:  Andrey Voronkov

La Romana

Head Coach:  Osiel Vázquez

Sfaxien

Head Coach:  Mohamed Ben Mustapha

References

External links
Official website

C
2013 in volleyball